Leyla İle Mecnun is a 1982 Turkish romantic drama film, directed by Halit Refiğ and starring Orhan Gencebay, Gülsen Bubikoglu, and Raik Alniaçik.

References

External links
Leyla İle Mecnun at the Internet Movie Database

1982 films
Turkish romantic drama films
1982 romantic drama films
Films directed by Halit Refiğ
1980s Turkish-language films